Martin Dies may refer to:
Martin Dies Sr. (1870–1922), U.S. Representative from Texas, father of Martin Dies Jr.
Known as Martin Dies during his lifetime, and as Martin Dies Sr. posthumously
Martin Dies Jr. (1900–1972), U.S. Representative from Texas, son of Martin Dies Sr. and father of Martin Dies Jr. (1921–2001)
Known as Martin Dies Jr. until the mid-1930s, and as Martin Dies or Martin Dies Sr. from the mid-1930s onward
Martin Dies Jr. (politician, born 1921) (1921–2001), Texas state senator, secretary of state, and jurist, son of Martin Dies Jr.
Known throughout his life as Martin Dies Jr.